The Journal of Baltic Studies, the official journal of the Association for the Advancement of Baltic Studies (AABS), is a peer-reviewed multidisciplinary academic journal founded in 1970 and published quarterly by Routledge, dedicated to the political, social, economic, and cultural life of the Baltic region and its history. Its current editor is Matthew Kott, historian and researcher at the Institute of Russian and Eurasian Studies at Uppsala University.

References

External links
 https://aabs-balticstudies.org/journal-of-baltic-studies/

European studies journals
Baltic states
Publications established in 1970
Taylor & Francis academic journals
Quarterly journals
English-language journals